Narodnyy Klub Veres Rivne is a Ukrainian professional football club based in Rivne. The club competes in the Ukrainian Premier League, the top tier of Ukrainian football, after winning the 2020–21 Ukrainian First League. Their home stadium until 2017 was Avanhard Stadium. As it is under reconstruction, they currently play home matches at Avanhard Stadium in Lutsk.

Founded in 1957, Veres first promoted to Ukrainian Premier League in 1992, and spent there 5 seasons in total over three periods. They achieved their best result of 6th place in 2017–18 season. Veres also reached the semi-finals of 1993–94 Ukrainian Cup.

The team ran into financial difficulties after the winter break of the 2010–11 season and was removed from the Ukrainian Second League. It was reinstated and resumed playing in the same league in 2015. The home uniform consists of red shirt with black shorts; the away uniform is all black.

History

Soviet times 
The team was founded in 1957 as Kolhospnyk (collective farm worker) and played the 1958 season in the Class B Third Zone, finishing 14th of the 16 teams that participated. The team played 13 seasons in Class B. The best results came in the 1968 and 1969 seasons when the team placed 7th. In 1966, it changed its name to Horyn after the river that flows in Volhynia.

After the reorganization of the Championship of the USSR in 1971, Horyn played in the Second League of the Ukrainian Zone until the fall of the Soviet Union. In 1972, the club became part of the all-Ukrainian Avanhard voluntary sports society and changed its name to Avanhard. In the first season in the Second League of the Ukrainian Zone Avanhard placed 26th. Starting in the late 1970s Avangard started progressing and in 1981 under the management of two famous Dynamo Kyiv players Viktor Matvienko and Volodymyr Troshkin Avanhard got 3rd place. Nine years later under the management of Viktor Pokora Avanhard placed 3rd again.

Three seasons in Vyshcha Liha 
During the fall of the Soviet Union it changed its name again to Veres (heather) and was placed in the 1992 Ukrainian First League. In the same season, Veres placed first and was promoted to the Vyshcha Liha. In their first season in Vyshcha, Veres placed last but wasn't relegated because the league was expanded. The following season was the most successful in the club's history. The team was 4th at the mid-way point, beating teams like FC Dnipro Dnipropetrovsk, FC Metalist Kharkiv, FC Shakhtar Donetsk, defeating FC Dynamo Kyiv in the Ukrainian Cup to reach the semi-final. But during the second half, Veres fell to 12th place. During the 1994–95 season, their second in the Premier League, Veres struggled and was relegated to the Ukrainian Second League.

Liquidation in 2011 
After relegation from the Ukrainian First League, Veres remained in the Second League until 2011 when, after 54 years as a professional football club, Veres declared bankruptcy and was liquidated.

The huge People's Club project 
On 19 March 2015, the club was reinstated as Public Union Rivne Football Club Veres Rivne by two Ukrainian public organizations "Rivne City Football Federation" and "Rivne Oblast Football Federation". The chairman of the Public Union became a well known businessman of Rivne Oblast Oleksiy Khakhlyov, a son-in-law of former President of Ukraine Viktor Yushchenko (check also FC Nafkom Brovary). It was the first club in Ukraine to have club membership among its fans and as of May 21 had over 3,500 members (3,728 in 2016). Khakhlyov initiated a powerful promotion campaign in social media such as Facebook ("the 12th player") to reflect popularity of the newly created club. The club was announced as "PEOPLE's" (Narodnyi). During the campaign members of the new club claimed that the club accepts no outsiders, only Rivne natives. About that fact even commented one of Ukrainian football journalist Artur Valerko complementing it as appealing, interesting, and seems like a "policy of Athletic Bilbao". The club's statute also stated that no one unrelated to Rivne Oblast may sponsor or in any way participate in the club. The idea of people's club is not new and previously for propaganda was used when FC Prykarpattia Ivano-Frankivsk transformed into FC Spartak Ivano-Frankivsk back in 2003 as People's Football Club Spartak Ivano-Frankivsk (NFK Spartak Ivano-Frankivsk).

In the 2015–16 Ukrainian Second League season, Veres finished in second place and was promoted to the Ukrainian First League. The promotion was widely celebrated at the Rivne city central square (Maidan Nezalezhnosti). Following the success Khakhlyov came out and announced, "I appeared in front of perspective that "Veres" wants to play in the First League, but there are no money. Membership contributions, help of the budget and sponsors are not enough. We gathered, conditionally speaking, 5 million, but need 15. Why 15? It is a simple thing. I cannot live without a dream. The dream was not only revive "Veres", but to get promoted to the First League. They were looking at me as on an idiot. Now I have a dream that "Veres" in the Premier League, Veres among elites of Ukrainian football. We will be realizing it".

After the end of the 2015–16 Ukrainian Second League season, the club was reconstituted as a limited liability company TOV FC Veres-Rivne by the Public Union "Rivne Football Club Veres Rivne" and Lviv Refrigerating Company "Limo", with the latter becoming the majority holder with a 61% stake. (Note: TOV is a Ukrainian acronym for limited liability company (tovarystvo z obmezhenoiu vidpovidalnistiu).) The Veres-Rivne company headed by Ihor Dedyshyn was founded to manage the club. Previously Dedyshyn was a sports journalist, football manager of FC Karpaty Lviv, and a manager of Lviv media company "ZIK". "Limo" whose final beneficiary is Bohdan Kopytko will cover the budget costs of approximately ₴15 million for the 2016–17 Ukrainian First League season. The goal for the season was to achieve promotion to the Ukrainian Premier League. The club FC Veres-Rivne received certification (attestation) to play in the PFL competitions from the Football Federation of Ukraine signed by O.Bandurko and Yu.Zapisotskyi (acting head of the FFU committee on licensing of clubs).

Following the reorganization from People's Club (NK) Veres Rivne to FC Veres-Rivne, the Rivne internet newspaper "Chetverta Vlada" called for explanation to Oleksiy Khakhlyov, whether the club is still "People's". Khakhlyov answered that the club was "People's", is "People's", and will be "People's". He then added, "the Public Union which had a certification as a professional club to play football in the 2015–16 Ukrainian Second League. There are property terms. In regards to special requirements to the teams that play in professional sports, there are certain requirements in regards to certification of professional clubs. It cannot be a "Public Union", because our "Public Union" a priory is a non-profit organization".

In the beginning of March 2017 the supervisory board of NK Veres Rivne announced that will not hold meeting as the club's leadership failed to submit the club's financial report for 2016. The supervisory board that was created in May 2015 was setup with controlling functions of the club, but has been ignored by the club's leadership.

2017: Desna vs Veres promotion scandal 
On 1 June 2017, it was announced that second-place club FC Desna Chernihiv was denied a license to play in the top division. The argument was that the club was not able to provide guarantees for adequate financing of infrastructure. The license was granted to NK Veres Rivne, the third-place team during the previous season in the second division.

Both clubs, FC Desna Chernihiv and NK Veres Rivne, had not played at their home stadiums in the 2016–17 Ukrainian First League. Desna had played in Kyiv at the Obolon Arena, while Veres played in Varash, at the Izotop Stadium of the Rivne Nuclear Power Plant. The administration of Desna released a letter of protest before a meeting of FFU representatives. In protest, the Desna administration announced that the club would not play its final game of the season against FC Illichivets Mariupol, but later relented. Nonetheless, during the game, players of both teams protested on the field in a special way: when the whistle was blown the players, instead of starting play, stood around kicking a ball back and forth among themselves.

On 2 June 2017, upon conclusion of its conference, the UPL administration announced the final composition of the league and calendar for the upcoming season. The conference confirmed the admission of Veres to the league, with only one vote against, from FC Dynamo Kyiv; six votes in favour of the decision; and three (including FC Zorya Luhansk) abstentions. On 2 June 2017, the Desna fans were picketing the House of Football in Kyiv after they arrived on four buses from Chernihiv.

On 7 June 2017, sports media UA-Football requested permission from Football Federation of Ukraine and FC Desna Chernihiv to publish related documents to clarify the situation and come to some kind of closure.

A number of football experts commented negatively on the situation, while the PFC Sumy head coach Anatoliy Bezsmertnyi stated sarcastically that these football functionaries would make Veres the national champions by decree. The former PFL president Svyatoslav Syrota said that the FFU vice-president was lying about Desna's problems. President of FC Inhulets Petrove, Oleksandr Porovoznyuk, called on other clubs to withdraw their teams from the league in support for FC Desna Chernihiv. President of FC Hirnyk-Sport Horishni Plavni Petro Kaplun stated that it made him laugh when the president of Veres, Oleksiy Khakhlev, asked that the regulations be followed, pointing out that Veres had been admitted to the Second League in complete disregard of the regulations. Kaplun also called on the FFU authorities to pay attention to what owners of professional clubs had to say as they have a right to express their vote of confidence or non-confidence in the FFU leadership.

Ukrainian Premier League successes 

In June 2017, Veres was taken over by Lviv businessman Bohdan Kopytko who was suspected of having ties with organized crime, and who was known under the nickname "Kopyto". Kopytko also owns the Lviv refrigerating company "Limo" and became an honorary president of NK Veres Rivne. On 27 March 2018, Kopytko became the president of Veres after Oleksiy Khakhlyov resigned. Khakhlyov claimed that he left his position because of possible conflict of interest between his positions with the club and with the Football Federation of Ukraine and the Football Federation of Rivne Oblast.

On 17 January 2018, NK Veres-Rivne officially re-registered as a Lviv-based club. On 19 February 2018, the Rivne city council announced that it would stop sponsoring the club because of its relocation to Lviv. On 13 March 2018, Veres became a provisional member of the Lviv Oblast Football Federation.

Finally, NK Veres Rivne took sixth place in the 2017–18 Ukrainian Premier League after a controversy which preceded the match of Round 31 with FC Shakhtar Donetsk in Kharkiv.

Castling of the big People's Club with FC Lviv
On 21 May 2018, news broke in Lviv that a type of "castling" (swap) was to take place between NK Veres Rivne and FC Lviv after which FC Lviv would advance straight to the Premier League, while NK Veres would join the lower league instead of Lviv. According to the official club's legend the big People's Club Veres Rivne was merged with the Second League FC Lviv and was recreated with admitting reinstated another no less bigger People's Club Veres in the Second League despite the Ukrainian Association of Football requirements to participate in amateur competitions before applying for professional competitions. One possible reason for the merger was that renovations at the club's home field, Avanhard Stadium, were suspended by the local authorities and had not yet recommenced. The Rivne-based media were claiming that the club is simply being renamed as FC Lviv.

On 21 May 2018, a letter signed by Kopytko that was published on the official website of the club confirmed the intention of the club's administration to merge with FC Lviv.

After the last game of the 2017–18 season with FC Mariupol, the club's fans were attacked by security group of Bohdan Kopytko including the general director of the club Andriy Pankiv.

Following the club's decision to merge with FC Lviv, some players announced that they would resign from the club. According to FootballHub, the following individuals had already left the club: players Yevhen Morozenko, Stanislav Kulish, Denys Kozhanov, Dmytro Fastov, Pavlo Lukyanchuk, Mykyta Kamenyuka, as well as sports director Anatoliy Sorokin, and some other staff members. According to Mykola Nesenyuk (FC Dynamo Kyiv department director in relations with mass media), the new NK Veres Rivne had no connection to the previous Veres club. During the interview to Channel 24 in May 2018 Nesenyuk who is native of Rivne added that the whole project with "People's Club" seems as a hoax.

On 12 June 2018 the FFU licensing committee headed by Anatoliy Bezsmertnyi announced that FC Lviv failed certification to play in the Second League, while FC Veres is certified to play in the Premiers.

In the 2018–19 season, the new NK Veres Rivne is set to play in the 2018–19 Ukrainian Second League with Oleksiy Khakhlyov as president and with a home stadium in Rivne Oblast.

In May 2019 it became clear that Veres was transformed into joint stock company consisting of public association Rivne football club Veres–Rivne, UkrTeplo (Rivneteploenerho), and Rivne city council (Avanhard Stadium).

Team names
{|class="wikitable"
|-bgcolor="#efefef"
|Year
|Name
|-
|1958–66
|Kolhospnyk
|-
|1966–72
|Horyn
|-
|1972–90
|Avanhard
|-
|1991–
|Veres
|}

Sponsors

Honors
Cup of the Ukrainian SSR
Runners-up (2): 1957, 1991
Ukrainian First League
Winners (2): 1992, 2020–21
Ukrainian Second League
Runners-up (1): 2015–16

Players

Current squad

Out on loan

Coaches and administration

Coaches

 Konstantin Shchegotsky (1957, 1966)
 Tiberiy Popovich (1961)
  (1971–72)
 Nikolai Mikhalev (1973)
  (1974–1976)
 Valentyn Tuharin (1977–1979)
 Viktor Matviyenko (1980–1982, 1985)
 Volodymyr Troshkin (1983–84)
 Volodymyr Polishchuk (1985–1987)
 Mykola Volkov (1989)
 Roman Pokora (1989–1991)
 Viktor Nosov (1991–1992)
 Vasiliy Kurilov (1992)
 Mykhailo Dunets (1993)
 Vyacheslav Kobyletskyi (1993, 1994–95)
 Mykhaylo Fomenko (1994)
 Vyacheslav Kobyletskyi (1994–95)
 Orest Bal (1995)
 Ivan Krasnetskyi (1995)
 Volodymyr Vusatyi (1995–96)
 Vyacheslav Kobyletskyi (1996–97)
 Mykola Yatsyuk (1997–1999)
 Serhiy Silvay (1999)
 Vyacheslav Kobyletskyi (1999)
 Serhiy Silvay (1999–2000)
 Hryhoriy Shalamay (2000–2003)
 Serhiy Silvay (2003)
 Vasyl Sondey (2004)
 Pavlo Ivanchov (2004–05)
 Roman Laba (2005)
 Giorgi Shengelia (2006)
 Serhiy Stashko (2006)
 Mykola Volkov (2006)
 Serhiy Silvay (2006)
 Ivan Kovanda (2007–08)
 Mykola Filin (2008–09)
 Andriy Kovtun (2009–10)
 Mykola Filin (2015)
 Oleh Lutkov (2015)
 Viktor Bohatyr (2015–2016)
 Volodymyr Mazyar (2016–2017)
 Yuriy Virt (2017)
 Yury Svirkov (2018)
 Andriy Demchenko (2018, caretaker)
 Volodymyr Homenyuk (2018)
 Oleh Shandruk (2018, caretaker)
 Oleh Shandruk (2018–2019)
 Yuriy Virt (2019–)

League and cup history

Soviet Union
{|class="wikitable"
|-bgcolor="#efefef"
! Season
! Div.
! Pos.
! Pl.
! W
! D
! L
! GS
! GA
! P
!Soviet Cup
!colspan=2|Other
!Notes
|-
|align=center colspan=14|Avangard / Avanhard Rovno
|-bgcolor=PowderBlue
|align=center|1985
|align=center rowspan=5|3rd
|align=center|23  
|align=center|40
|align=center|13
|align=center|10
|align=center|17
|align=center|37
|align=center|44
|align=center|36
|align=center|
|align=center|
|align=center|
|align=center|
|-bgcolor=PowderBlue
|align=center|1986
|align=center|11
|align=center|40
|align=center|16
|align=center|9
|align=center|15
|align=center|46
|align=center|44
|align=center|41
|align=center|
|align=center|
|align=center|
|align=center|
|-bgcolor=PowderBlue
|align=center|1987
|align=center|14
|align=center|52
|align=center|19
|align=center|14
|align=center|19
|align=center|50
|align=center|53
|align=center|52
|align=center|
|align=center|
|align=center|
|align=center|
|-bgcolor=PowderBlue
|align=center|1988
|align=center|14
|align=center|50
|align=center|21
|align=center|8
|align=center|21
|align=center|52
|align=center|56
|align=center|50
|align=center|
|align=center|
|align=center|
|align=center|
|-bgcolor=PowderBlue
|align=center|1989
|align=center|19
|align=center|52
|align=center|14
|align=center|17
|align=center|21
|align=center|39
|align=center|41
|align=center|45
|align=center|
|align=center|
|align=center|
|align=center bgcolor=pink|Relegated
|-bgcolor=PowderBlue
|align=center|1990
|align=center rowspan=2|3rd 
|align=center bgcolor=tan|3
|align=center|36
|align=center|21
|align=center|11
|align=center|4
|align=center|53
|align=center|27
|align=center|53
|align=center|
|align=center|USSR
|align=center| finals
|align=center|
|-bgcolor=PowderBlue
|align=center|1991
|align=center|4
|align=center|50
|align=center|28
|align=center|13
|align=center|9
|align=center|67
|align=center|38
|align=center|69
|align=center|
|align=center|USSR
|align=center bgcolor=silver|Finalist
|align=center|
|}

Ukraine
{|class="wikitable"
|-bgcolor="#efefef"
! Season
! Div.
! Pos.
! Pl.
! W
! D
! L
! GS
! GA
! P
!Ukrainian Cup
!colspan=2|Other
!Notes
|-
|align=center colspan=14|Veres Rivne
|-bgcolor=LightCyan
|align=center|1992
|align=center|2nd "A"
|align=center bgcolor=gold|1
|align=center|26
|align=center|14
|align=center|8
|align=center|4
|align=center|38
|align=center|15
|align=center|36
|align=center|1/32 finals
|align=center|
|align=center|
|align=center bgcolor=lightgreen|Promoted
|-
|align=center|1992–93
|align=center rowspan=3|1st
|align=center|16
|align=center|30
|align=center|9
|align=center|6
|align=center|15
|align=center|29
|align=center|42
|align=center|24
|align=center|1/8 finals
|align=center|
|align=center|
|align=center|
|-
|align=center|1993–94
|align=center|12
|align=center|34
|align=center|10
|align=center|12
|align=center|12
|align=center|32
|align=center|36
|align=center|32
|align=center bgcolor=tan|1/2 finals
|align=center|
|align=center|
|align=center|
|-
|align=center|1994–95
|align=center|18
|align=center|34
|align=center|8
|align=center|7
|align=center|19
|align=center|28
|align=center|63
|align=center|31
|align=center|1/8 finals
|align=center|
|align=center|
|align=center bgcolor=pink|Relegated
|-bgcolor=LightCyan
|align=center|1995–96
|align=center rowspan=2|2nd
|align=center|16
|align=center|42
|align=center|15
|align=center|9
|align=center|18
|align=center|39
|align=center|49
|align=center|54
|align=center|1/32 finals
|align=center|
|align=center|
|align=center|
|-bgcolor=LightCyan
|align=center|1996–97
|align=center|23
|align=center|46
|align=center|9
|align=center|6
|align=center|26
|align=center|36
|align=center|79
|align=center|42
|align=center|1/32 finals 2nd Stage
|align=center|
|align=center|
|align=center bgcolor=pink|Relegated
|-bgcolor=PowderBlue
|align=center|1997–98
|align=center rowspan=14|3rd "A"
|align=center|4
|align=center|34
|align=center|14
|align=center|10
|align=center|10
|align=center|42
|align=center|33
|align=center|52
|align=center|1/64 finals
|align=center|
|align=center|
|align=center|
|-bgcolor=PowderBlue
|align=center|1998–99
|align=center|13
|align=center|28
|align=center|6
|align=center|3
|align=center|19
|align=center|13
|align=center|50
|align=center|15
|align=center|1/128 finals
|align=center|
|align=center|
|align=center|
|-bgcolor=PowderBlue
|align=center|1999-00
|align=center|14
|align=center|30
|align=center|7
|align=center|7
|align=center|16
|align=center|32
|align=center|51
|align=center|28
|align=center|2nd League Cup
|align=center|2LC
|align=center|withdrew
|align=center|
|-bgcolor=PowderBlue
|align=center|2000–01
|align=center|12
|align=center|30
|align=center|7
|align=center|6
|align=center|17
|align=center|26
|align=center|52
|align=center|27
|align=center|2nd League Cup
|align=center|2LC
|align=center|withdrew
|align=center|
|-bgcolor=PowderBlue
|align=center|2001–02
|align=center|6
|align=center|36
|align=center|18
|align=center|10
|align=center|8
|align=center|41
|align=center|23
|align=center|64
|align=center|1st round
|align=center|
|align=center|
|align=center|
|-bgcolor=PowderBlue
|align=center|2002–03
|align=center|7
|align=center|28
|align=center|11
|align=center|3
|align=center|14
|align=center|28
|align=center|39
|align=center|36
|align=center|1/32 finals
|align=center|
|align=center|
|align=center|
|-bgcolor=PowderBlue
|align=center|2003–04
|align=center|10
|align=center|30
|align=center|9
|align=center|8
|align=center|13
|align=center|32
|align=center|43
|align=center|35
|align=center|1/16 finals
|align=center|
|align=center|
|align=center|
|-bgcolor=PowderBlue
|align=center|2004–05
|align=center|11
|align=center|28
|align=center|9
|align=center|6
|align=center|13
|align=center|35
|align=center|38
|align=center|33
|align=center|1/32 finals
|align=center|
|align=center|
|align=center|
|-bgcolor=PowderBlue
|align=center|2005–06
|align=center|7
|align=center|28
|align=center|12
|align=center|6
|align=center|10
|align=center|33
|align=center|40
|align=center|42
|align=center|1/8 finals
|align=center|
|align=center|
|align=center|
|-bgcolor=PowderBlue
|align=center|2006–07
|align=center|13
|align=center|28
|align=center|5
|align=center|7
|align=center|16
|align=center|24
|align=center|44
|align=center|22
|align=center|1/32 finals
|align=center|
|align=center|
|align=center|
|-bgcolor=PowderBlue
|align=center|2007–08
|align=center|14
|align=center|30
|align=center|7
|align=center|8
|align=center|15
|align=center|25
|align=center|44
|align=center|29
|align=center|Did not enter
|align=center|
|align=center|
|align=center|
|-bgcolor=PowderBlue
|align=center|2008–09
|align=center|13
|align=center|32
|align=center|11
|align=center|6
|align=center|15
|align=center|24
|align=center|32
|align=center|39
|align=center|1/64 finals
|align=center|
|align=center|
|align=center|
|-bgcolor=PowderBlue
|align=center|2009–10
|align=center|9
|align=center|20
|align=center|4
|align=center|4
|align=center|12
|align=center|16
|align=center|41
|align=center|16
|align=center|1/32 finals
|align=center|LC
|align=center|Group stage
|align=center|
|-bgcolor=PowderBlue
|align=center|2010–11
|align=center|12
|align=center|22
|align=center|0
|align=center|0
|align=center|22
|align=center|4
|align=center|51
|align=center|−3
|align=center|1/64 finals
|align=center|
|align=center|
|align=center bgcolor=pink|−3 – Expelled
|-
|align=center|2011–15
|align=center colspan=13|Club idle
|-bgcolor=PowderBlue
|align=center|2015–16
|align=center|3rd
|align=center bgcolor=silver|2
|align=center|26
|align=center|16
|align=center|4
|align=center|6
|align=center|41
|align=center|24
|align=center|52
|align=center| finals
|align=center|
|align=center|
|align=center bgcolor=lightgreen|Promoted
|-bgcolor=LightCyan
|align=center|2016–17
|align=center|2nd
|align=center bgcolor=tan|3
|align=center|34
|align=center|20
|align=center|7
|align=center|7
|align=center|62
|align=center|32
|align=center|67
|align=center| finals
|align=center|
|align=center|
|align=center bgcolor=lightgreen|Promoted
|-
|align=center|2017–18
|align=center|1st
|align=center|6/12
|align=center|32
|align=center|7
|align=center|14
|align=center|11
|align=center|28
|align=center|30
|align=center|35
|align=center| finals
|align=center|
|align=center|
|align=center bgcolor=pink|Swapped with FC Lviv
|-bgcolor=PowderBlue
|align=center|2018–19
|align=center|3rd "A"
|align=center|5/10
|align=center|27
|align=center|12
|align=center|5
|align=center|10
|align=center|24
|align=center|22
|align=center|37
|align=center| finals
|align=center|
|align=center|
|align=center|
|-bgcolor=PowderBlue
| align="center" |2019–20
| align="center" |3rd "A"
| align="center" bgcolor=tan|3/11
| align="center" |20
| align="center" |11
| align="center" |3
| align="center" |6
| align="center" |34
| align="center" |23
| align="center" |36
| align="center" | finals
| align="center" |
| align="center" |
|align=center bgcolor=lightgreen|Promoted as play-off winner
|-bgcolor=LightCyan
| align="center" |2020–21
| align="center" |2nd"A"
|align=center bgcolor=gold|1
| align="center" |30
| align="center" |21
| align="center" |5
| align="center" |4
| align="center" |56
| align="center" |21
| align="center" |36
| align="center" | finals
| align="center" |
| align="center" |
|align=center bgcolor=lightgreen|Promoted
|-bgcolor=White
|align=center|2021-22
|align=center|1st
|align=center|
|align=center|
|align=center|
|align=center|
|align=center|
|align=center|
|align=center|
|align=center|
|align=center|
|align=center|
|align=center|
|}

Notes

References

External links
 Official website 
 Artur Kysliachenko. What is in your name? Appealing Veres of 1990s and unordinary businessmen (Що в імені твоєму? Привабливий Верес 90-х і неоднозначні бізнесмени). UA-Football. 22 April 2020.
 On the subject of Oleksiy Khakhlyov and Veres. Chetverta Vlada.

 
Ukrainian Premier League clubs
Sport in Rivne
Football clubs in Rivne Oblast
Association football clubs established in 1957
1957 establishments in Ukraine
Football clubs in the Ukrainian Soviet Socialist Republic
Avanhard (sports society)
Agrarian association football clubs in Ukraine